Ptychatractus is a genus of sea snails, marine gastropod mollusks in the family Ptychatractidae.

Species
Species within the genus Ptychatractus include:

 Ptychatractus ligatus (Mighels & C.B. Adams, 1842)
 Ptychatractus occidentalis Stearns, 1873
 Ptychatractus youngi Kilburn, 1975

References

Ptychatractidae